Severe Tropical Cyclone Gavin was the most intense tropical cyclone to affect Fiji, since Cyclone Oscar of the 1982–83 cyclone season and was the first of three tropical cyclones to affect the island nations of Tuvalu and Wallis and Futuna during the 1996–97 season. The system that was to become Gavin was first identified during March 2, as a weak tropical depression that had developed within the monsoon trough of low pressure. Over the next two days the depression gradually developed further, before it was named Gavin by RSMC Nadi early on March 4 as it had developed into a tropical cyclone.

Meteorological history

During March 2, 1997, the Fiji Meteorological Service reported that a slow moving tropical depression had developed within the monsoon trough to the northwest of the Fijian dependency of Rotuma.

Over the next two days, the depression gradually developed further as it moved slowly towards the east — southeast, before the JTWC reported at 0600 UTC on March 3, that the system had become equivalent to a tropical storm and designated it as Tropical Cyclone 31P. Throughout that day Gavin intensified further before RSMC Nadi reported early on March 4, that the depression had become a category one tropical cyclone on the Australian tropical cyclone intensity scale and named it Gavin. After being named Gavin moved eastwards towards the southern Tuvaluan Islands and intensified quickly, with the JTWC reporting later that day that the system had become equivalent to a category 1 hurricane on the Saffir-Simpson hurricane scale (SSHS).

Early on March 5, RSMC Nadi reported that Gavin had become a category 3 severe tropical cyclone after the system had developed an eye.

Preparations and impact

Severe Tropical Cyclone Gavin was responsible for at least 18 deaths as it affected Fiji and parts of Polynesia, before it was retired from the tropical cyclone naming lists.

Tuvalu
Gavin was the first of three tropical cyclones to affect Tuvalu during the 1996-97 cyclone season, with Cyclones Hina and Keli affecting the islands later in the season. Ahead of the system affecting the Polynesian island nation, hurricane warnings were issued for Niulakita and Nukulaelae, while gale or storm warnings were issued for the rest of Tuvalu. During the next day these warnings were gradually revised once it became clearer that Gavin was moving towards the southeast and away from the island nation, before all warnings were cancelled by 0600 UTC on March 6. After both Gavin and Hina had affected the island nation within a week off each other, a damage assessment team noted that it was difficult to assess damage done by Gavin alone and estimated the total damage from both cyclones at ,. Both cyclones caused severe coastal erosion and destruction to food crops, on the southern islands of Niulakita and Nukulaelae, while damage in northern and central islands was confined mostly to houses. The cyclones waves, storm surge and strong winds both caused a severe amount of coastal erosion on all of the country's nine atolls, with about 6.7% of the land washed into the sea.

Wallis and Futuna
Early on March 5, the FMS issued a tropical cyclone alert for the French Overseas Territory, as Gavin was moving slowly towards the east — southeast and heading towards the islands. Later that day as Gavin turned and started to move southwards the FMSupgraded the alert to a gale warning for Futuna, but due to the turn to the south it was felt that a warning for Wallis Island wasn't needed. The alert for Wallis was subsequently cancelled early the next day while the Gale Warning was maintained for Futuna, as that island was still expected to be within the extent of gale-force winds during that day. The gale warning for Futuna was cancelled later that day, after Gavin had moved well to the southwest of the island and moving further away. Most of the damage on the French territory was confined to the exposed northeast coastal parts of Futuna, where a heavy swell caused sea flooding at high tide and several food crops were damaged by the wind. This heavy swell resulted in some roads and public networks, being partially destroyed and some traditional houses being damaged. On Wallis Island, only a small amount of damage was reported, with some traditional houses and food crops flooded on the north coast by seawater at high tide.

Fiji
During March 4, the FMSissued a tropical cyclone alert for Rotuma, as it was possible that Gavin could produce gale-force winds or pass over the island within 48 hours. As they cancelled the alert for Rotuma, the FMSissued an alert for Fiji as it was apparent that Gavin was moving southwards towards the archipelago, before they started to issue various gale and storm warnings for Fiji during March 6. Over the next two days, the FMSissued various gale, storm and hurricane warnings for Fiji, as the system passed through the archipelago, before all warnings for Fiji were cancelled during March 8, after it had become apparent that gales were no longer affecting any part of Fiji.

Heavy rain associated with Gavin caused serious flooding in Labasa and western parts of Viti Levu and caused serious flooding of the Nadi and Ba rivers. Major destruction of sugar cane and other food crops also occurred while at least 18 deaths were attributed to Gavin. This included 10 people lost at sea when a fishing vessel, the Wasawasa I, sank, and another 8 deaths caused by landslides, electrocution, and drowning. However, despite devastating several parts of Fiji, Gavins turn to the southwest just before it moved through the island nation spared Fijis two main populated islands of Vanua Levu and Viti Levu the full brunt of the cyclone.

New Zealand
As a result of the heavy rain, some flooding was reported in parts of the Northland, Waikato, Bay of Plenty and Gisborne, which led to road closures.

Notes

See also

Cyclone Evan

References

External links

1997 in Fiji
1996–97 South Pacific cyclone season
1997 in Tuvalu
1997 in Wallis and Futuna
1997 in New Zealand
Category 4 South Pacific cyclones
Tropical cyclones in Fiji
Tropical cyclones in Tuvalu
Tropical cyclones in Wallis and Futuna
Tropical cyclones in New Zealand
Retired South Pacific cyclones